Bangma is a surname. Notable people with the surname include: 

Diederik Bangma (born 1990), Dutch footballer
Tristan Bangma (born 1997), Dutch Paralympic cyclist